Maamoon Sami Rasheed al-Alwani (born 1957) was an Iraqi politician, who served as governor of the Al Anbar province. He was appointed by the Anbar Provincial Council in May 2005, following the murder of the previous governor, Raja Nawaf Farhan al-Mahalawi. He was a member of the Abu Alwani clan, part of the Dulaim tribe. His name was found along with the names of other prominent Iraqi Sunni leaders who had been targeted for assassination in a captured al-Qaida in Iraq (AQI) document.

Insurgents kidnapped Alwani's son on September 6, 2005, but he was later safely returned. In March 2007, two of Alwani's nieces were killed in improvised explosive device (IED) attacks.

In late October 2007, Alwani was part of a delegation of Anbari government and tribal officials that travelled to the United States to drum up support for reconstruction efforts in the province upon an official invitation from the US Department of State. The following month, Alwani expressed to reporters that his primary concern was that a sectarian-divided Iraq would inspire meddling from Iran and other neighboring countries. He also invited private investors from the US to help develop Anbar's oil and natural reserves in the southern Akaz region.

Assassination attempts
Alwani survived at least 31 assassination attempts since assuming office in May 2005.

On August 18, 2005, insurgents opened fire on the governor and a group of prominent Sunni Muslim clerics as they were meeting in Ramadi. Witnesses said Alwani was holding talks with members of the Muslim Clerics Association in Ramadi's Al Dawla al-Kabeer mosque when the gunmen opened fire. The governor and the head of the Muslim Clerics Association in Ramadi, Thamir al-Dulaimi, escaped injury, but Dhahir al-Obeidi, head of the Sunni Endowment organisation, was wounded along with his deputy.

In early May 2006, Alwani escaped with minor wounds when a bomb exploded near his convoy. The bomb exploded as he was travelling to his office in Ramadi.

On December 25, 2007, several mortar rounds hit the governor's office at the Government Center in downtown Ramadi.

See also
Al Anbar Governorate
Iraqi Islamic Party (IIP)
Provincial Government (Anbar)

References

1957 births
Governors of Al Anbar Governorate
Iraqi Islamic Party politicians
2021 deaths